Rafi is a male given name of Arabic origin. It is one of the names of God in Islam, stemming from the Arabic verb rafaʿa (رَفَعَ), meaning "to lift, to raise (something high)". It is distinct from another male name, Rafi (meaning "exalted/grand/high"). Other common transcriptions include "Rafee", "Rafie", "Rafay" and "Raffy".

Raffi ( or ) is also an Armenian given name. It was popularized by the 19th-century author Hakob Melik Hakobian, who adopted it as his pen name.

Rafi is also a common nickname amongst Jews for people named Rafael.

People named Rafi

Last name
 Mirza Rafi Sauda, Urdu language poet
 Mohammed Rafi, Indian playback singer
 Mohammed Rafi (footballer), Indian footballer
 Muhammad Rafi Usmani, Pakistani Deobandi scholar
 Muhammad Rafi, Dagestani historian of the 13th century

First name

Rafi
 Rafi ibn al-Layth, Khurasani Arab leader of a rebellion against the Abbasid Caliphate in 806–809
 Rafi ibn Harthama (died 896), ruler of Khurasan (882–892)
 Rafi Ul-Darjat (1699–1719), tenth Mughal emperor (for three months)
 Rafi Ud-Daulat, birth name of Shah Jahan II (1696–1719), briefly Mughal emperor in 1719, elder brother of Rafi Ul-Darjat
 Rafi Ahmed Kidwai, Indian politician
 Rafi Amit, Israeli poker player
 Rafi Cohen (born 1965), Israeli soccer player and coach
 Rafi Eitan, Israeli politician
 Rafi Escudero, musician, singer and poet from Puerto Rico
 Rafi Gavron, British actor
 Rafi Greenberg, senior lecturer in archaeology at Tel Aviv University
 Rafi Khawar, Pakistani actor
 Rafi Manoukian, former member of the city council in Glendale, California
 Rafi Menco (born 1994), Israeli basketball player
 Rafi Pitts, Iranian film director
 Rafi Yoeli, Israeli inventor
 Rafi Zabor, American musician and novelist
 Sultan Rafi Sharif Bey, pioneer in development of Islamic culture in the United States, born Yale Jean Singer
 Rafi and Mecartin, director duo in Malayalam films
 Rafi Peretz, Israeli rabbi and politician

Raffi
 Raffi Ahmad, (born 1987), Indonesian celebrity artist
 Raffi Lavie (1937–2007), Israeli artist
 Raffi Torres (born 1981), Canadian professional ice hockey player

Raffi (Armenian)
 Raffi, full name Raffi Cavoukian (born 1948), Canadian singer-songwriter known for his children's music
 Raffi (novelist) (1835-1888), pen name of the Armenian author of Hakop Melik Hakopian
 Raffi Armenian (born 1942), Canadian conductor, pianist, composer, and teacher
 Raffi Boghosian (born 1990), Iraqi broadcast journalist and TV host
 Raffi Boghosyan, or Raffi, (born 1993), Bulgarian singer

In fiction
 Rafi, in the British web series Corner Shop Show.

See also
 Rafi (disambiguation)
 Raffi (disambiguation)
 "Raffie", nickname of Raphael Wallace (born 1957), Nevisian former cricketer
 Mohammed Rafie (born 1946), former Minister of Defense and a vice-president of the Democratic Republic of Afghanistan

References

Masculine given names